The Stung Treng Dam is a proposed hydroelectric dam on the Mekong River in Stung Treng Province, Cambodia.  It would be located on the mainstream of the Lower Mekong River. The project is controversial for several reasons, including its possible impact on the fisheries, as well as other ecological and environmental factors.

History
In 2007, the Russian company Bureyagesstroy, a subsidiary of RusHydro, received a license to conduct a feasibility study on a dam.  The feasibility study was carried out and the company asked permission to build the hydroelectric power station.  However, on December 9, 2009, a memorandum of understanding was signed between the Cambodian Government and the Vietnam Industrial and Urban Area Investment Development Corp (IDICO) to conduct a new feasibility study on the dam.  The results of this survey have not been released.

In March 2020, due to ecological concerns, the Cambodian government halted all hydroelectric developments on the Mekong River until 2030, pushing back the Stung Treng dam project along with its neighbour the Sambor Dam project.

Despite the ban, The Royal Group conglomerate received permission from the Ministry of Mines and Energy to conduct feasibility studies for the dam at three potential sites in 2022.

Description
The Stung Treng Dam would be an earth core rock-fill gravity dam. Its rated head would be . It would have an installed capacity of 980 MW, and would, on average, generate 4,870 GWh per year.

Impact
Multiple independent agencies, including International Rivers, the Save the Mekong campaign and others have raised concerns about the dam's construction. In addition, Cambodia is a member of the Mekong River Commission, which requires prior notification of hydropower construction on the river's mainstream – i.e. plans for the Stung Treng will be subject to scrutiny by Laos, Thailand and Vietnam. A report authorized by the Mekong River Commission and released in January 2010 recommended that the Stung Treng along with the Sambor Dam be delayed for 10 years. A 2012 study by the Ministry of Agriculture, Forestry and Fisheries's Inland Fisheries Research and Development Institute found that the Stung Treng dam would reduce yields of fish and other aquatic animals by 6% to 24%.

The dam site lies within the Stung Treng Ramsar Site, which effectively obliges the Royal Cambodian Government to ‘actively support' the three 'pillars' of the Ramsar Convention:
 ensuring the conservation and wise use of wetlands it has designated as Wetlands of International Importance,
 including as far as possible the wise use of all wetlands in national environmental planning, 
 consulting with other Parties about implementation of the Convention, especially in regard to transboundary wetlands, shared water systems, and shared species.

It is expected that fish migration routes (which support the world's largest inland fishery on the Tonlé Sap) will be essentially wholly impeded. The two proposed dams of the Sambor and the Stung Treng would have the Mekong river basin's highest sediment trapping efficiencies of all the Lower Mekong Basin's proposed mainstream projects, destabilizing downstream channels between Kratié and Phnom Penh and reducing over bank siltation in the Cambodian floodplain.

If built, an estimated 21 villages with 2,059 households and 10,617 people will be displaced with the construction of the dam.

See also
Lower Se San 2 Dam

References

Further reading
Halls, A.S. and Kshatriya, M. 2009. Modeling the Cumulative barrier and passage  effects of mainstream hydropower dams on migratory fish populations in the Lower Mekong Basin.
MRC Technical Paper No. 25. Vientiane, Mekong River Commission.
King, P., Bird, J. and Haas, L. 2007. The current status of environmental criteria for hydropower development in the Mekong Region: a literature compilation. Vientiane, Lao PDR, WWF-Living Mekong Program.

External links

Dams in the Mekong River Basin
Proposed hydroelectric power stations
Hydroelectric power stations in Cambodia
Dams in Cambodia
Dam controversies
Stung Treng province
Proposed renewable energy power stations in Cambodia